Joe Ruttman (born October 28, 1944) is a retired American stock car racing driver who competed in NASCAR's Sprint Cup Series, Nationwide Series, and Camping World Truck Series. With 13 career wins in the Truck Series he is currently tied for 13th on the all-time wins list with Mike Bliss (as of October 13th, 2021). He is the younger brother of Troy Ruttman.

USAC Stock Cars
Ruttman was the United States Automobile Club's 1978 USAC Stock Car Rookie of the Year, and the 1980 USAC Series champion.

NASCAR

Ruttman made his NASCAR Grand National Series (now known as the Monster Energy NASCAR Cup Series) debut in 1963 at Riverside International Raceway, finishing 10th at the Winston Western 500. He drove in three more Series races between 1964 and 1980, while racing local tracks in between. Ruttman caught a big break in 1981 when J.D. Stacy, who had just bought Rod Osterlund's team, hired him to take over for Dale Earnhardt, who left the team mid-season to join Richard Childress Racing. Ruttman went on to run a full Series schedule from 1982 through 1984, 1986, and 1991. His best season was in 1983, when he finished 12th in points. During his 20 years in the Sprint Cup Series he had 60 top-ten finishes and 19 top-fives. He came very close to winning a race at Richmond in 1982, but a late power-steering failure sent his car into the wall and gave Dave Marcis the victory. He also picked up a runner-up finish at the same track, finishing 5 seconds behind Kyle Petty in 1986, although, had Ruttman not been collected in a final-lap accident, he would have actually won.

In 1995, Ruttman competed in the inaugural NASCAR SuperTrucks Series (now known as the Gander Outdoors Truck Series), where he would finally reach his potential. Joe Ruttman would dominate the middle of the season, winning two races that year on his way to finishing second in the championship. His success as a full-time driver in the Truck Series continued as he went on to win 11 more races between 1996 and 2007. He won his last race at age 56, making him the oldest race winner in any NASCAR division.

At Rockingham in 2004, Ruttman made his first Cup Series start since 1995, driving a one-off race for Phoenix Racing. However, it was a controversial "start-and-park" run. Ruttman contributed to an ongoing controversy by not showing up with a pit crew, and only coming to collect a small share of the prize money. Ruttman was ordered off the track by NASCAR after one lap and team owner James Finch was admonished by officials. At the time, there was a controversy over unqualified "field-fillers" being in the race and led to changes in the NASCAR rulebook.

Personal life
Born in Upland, California, Ruttman is a resident of North Port, Florida. He is the younger brother of Indianapolis 500 winner Troy Ruttman.
His father, Ralph "Butch" Ruttman, was an award winning mechanic on top Indy teams.

Motorsports career results

NASCAR
(key) (Bold – Pole position awarded by qualifying time. Italics – Pole position earned by points standings or practice time. * – Most laps led.)

Grand National Series

Nextel Cup Series

Daytona 500

Nationwide Series

Craftsman Truck Series

ARCA Re/Max Series
(key) (Bold – Pole position awarded by qualifying time. Italics – Pole position earned by points standings or practice time. * – Most laps led.)

References

External links
 
 

Living people
1944 births
People from Upland, California
Racing drivers from California
NASCAR drivers
USAC Stock Car drivers
ARCA Menards Series drivers
American Speed Association drivers
Sportspeople from San Bernardino County, California
RFK Racing drivers